The Nokia C2-03 is a mobile phone manufactured by Nokia. This is one of the first mobile phones released by Nokia that possesses a touchscreen in a "slider" form factor (the other one being Nokia C2-02). Previously released touchscreen devices from Nokia using Series 40 Operating System have been in "candybar" form factor.

Features                                                                                                                                                                                                                                                                                                                                                                                                                                                                                                                                                                                                                                                                                                                                                                                                                                                                                                                                                                                      

The key feature of this phone is touch and type and Dual SIM. It means that the phone has touch screen and alpha-numeric (12 key) keyboard but no navigation or soft keys. Other main features include: a 2.0-megapixel camera, Maps, Bluetooth 2.1 + EDR, Flash Lite 3.0 and MIDP Java 2.1 with additional Java APIs.

Specification sheet

References

External links
http://www.gsmarena.com/nokia_c2_03-3995.php      
 Nokia C2-03 Device specifications at Forum Nokia

Mobile phones introduced in 2011
C2-03
Mobile phones with user-replaceable battery
Slider phones